Rocco Anthony Mediate (born December 17, 1962) is an American professional golfer who has won six times on the PGA Tour and three times on the PGA Tour Champions. In the 2008 U.S. Open at Torrey Pines South Course, he finished runner-up after losing the first sudden-death hole after an 18-hole playoff to Tiger Woods. In 2016, Mediate won the Senior PGA Championship, one of the five senior majors.

Early years
Mediate was born in Greensburg, Pennsylvania. According to the Golf Channel, he is the son of a barber and has Italian ancestral heritage. Mediate attended Hempfield Area High School. When he attended Florida Southern College, he was a member of the golf team. His close friend Lee Janzen, another PGA Tour pro, also played there. They helped lead Florida Southern to the 1985 Division II national team championship.

Professional career

Mediate turned professional in 1985. His golfing career has been marred by back trouble.  Early on, he compensated by using a long putter. In 1991 he became the first player to win on the PGA Tour using a long putter when he won the Doral-Ryder Open. He picked up another victory at the 1993 KMart Greater Greensboro Open, but he then had a long layoff due to a ruptured disk. He underwent major back surgery in 1999, but lost practically five years of his career. Back pain returned in 2004 and later nearly ended his career.

Mediate returned to the Tour in 1996 playing under a special medical extension and performed steadily. He picked up wins on the Tour in 1999, 2000 and 2002. After improving his fitness to minimize his back problems, he returned to using a conventional putter in 2003.

Mediate has been featured in the top 20 of the Official World Golf Ranking and considered to be one of the best putters in golf. At the 2006 Masters, Mediate was in contention to win the event on the final day until he took a septuple-bogey ten on the par-three 12th hole. His best finish in a major championship was a second-place showing at the 2008 U.S. Open at Torrey Pines South Course. Tied with Tiger Woods at -1 after regular tournament play, then tied again at even par through the 18 hole playoff, Woods finally bested Mediate on the first hole (hole #7) of sudden death, the 91st hole of the tournament. It was only the third time a U.S. Open playoff had gone to sudden death. Mediate's performance gained him 111 spots in the world golf rankings, moving him from 158th to 47th place.

Mediate earned his first win since 2002 at the 2010 Frys.com Open by beating Bo Van Pelt and Alex Prugh by one shot. During the tournament, Mediate holed out all four days. He started on Thursday, with a hole-in-one on the 189 yard par-3 3rd hole. On Friday, he holed out from 160 yards on the par-4 4th hole for an eagle, followed on Saturday with a hole-out from 111 yards on the par-5 15th hole, also for eagle. On Sunday, he was tied for the lead on the 17th hole when he holed from 116 yards for eagle to take a two-shot lead. He parred the 18th to win the tournament. He also became the oldest wire-to-wire winner on the PGA Tour since at least 1970.

Mediate has PGA Tour career earnings of over $16 million.

Mediate joined the Champions Tour for 2013 after turning 50 and his exemption for his 2010 PGA Tour win ended. He won in his debut at the Allianz Championship, the 16th Champions Tour player to do so. After shooting a 61 in the second round, he claimed victory by two strokes over Bernhard Langer and Tom Pernice Jr. with a birdie at the last hole. He won his second Champions Tour tournament that September, at the Shaw Charity Classic. Mediate finished seven strokes ahead of runner-up, Tom Byrum.

In May 2016, Mediate won his first senior major championship at the Senior PGA Championship, with a three-stroke victory over the defending champion Colin Montgomerie. His winning total of 265 (−19) broke the previous record by three and was the first wire-to-wire victory at the event since Jack Nicklaus in 1991. His victory was sealed when he holed out from a greenside bunker on the 71st hole of regulation play for birdie.

On September 22, 2019, Mediate won the Sanford International on the PGA Tour Champions in South Dakota.

Other activities
On October 9, 2006, it was announced that Mediate would become an on-course reporter for The Golf Channel's 2007 PGA Tour coverage.

Personal life
Mediate is a distant cousin of Puerto Rico Islanders soccer player Domenic Mediate.

Professional wins (13)

PGA Tour wins (6)

PGA Tour playoff record (2–1)

Other wins (3)

Other playoff record (0–1)

PGA Tour Champions wins (4)

Results in major championships

CUT = missed the half-way cut
WD = Withdrew
"T" = tied

Summary

Most consecutive cuts made – 8 (1991 PGA – 1993 PGA)
Longest streak of top-10s – 1 (four times)

Results in The Players Championship

CUT = missed the halfway cut
"T" indicates a tie for a place

Results in World Golf Championships

1Cancelled due to 9/11

QF, R16, R32, R64 = Round in which player lost in match play
WD = Withdrew
"T" = tied
NT = No Tournament

Senior major championships

Wins (1)

Results timeline
Results not in chronological order before 2022.

CUT = missed the halfway cut
WD = withdrew
"T" indicates a tie for a place
NT = No tournament due to COVID-19 pandemic

U.S. national team appearances
UBS Cup: 2003 (tie)
Wendy's 3-Tour Challenge (representing PGA Tour): 2000 (winners), 2008

See also
1985 PGA Tour Qualifying School graduates
1986 PGA Tour Qualifying School graduates

References

External links

American male golfers
Florida Southern Moccasins men's golfers
PGA Tour golfers
PGA Tour Champions golfers
Winners of senior major golf championships
Golfers from Pennsylvania
Golfers from Florida
American people of Italian descent
People from Greensburg, Pennsylvania
Sportspeople from Naples, Florida
1962 births
Living people